Laishram may refer to:

Laishram Monika Devi (born 1983), Indian weightlifter from Manipur
Laishram Sarita Devi (born 1982), Indian boxer from Manipur
Bombayla Devi Laishram (born 1985), Indian archer
Devendro Laishram (born 1992), also known as Devendro Singh, Indian boxer
Lin Laishram, Indian model, actress and businesswoman from Manipur
Soma Laishram (born 1992), Indian film actress and singer who appears in Manipuri films
Laishram Bedashwor Singh (born 1998), Indian professional footballer
Laishram Jyotin Singh, AC, Officer in the Army Medical Corps of the Indian Army
Laishram Nabakishore Singh, Indian teacher, herbalist and physician of traditional medicine
Laishram Nandakumar Singh, veteran politician from Manipur, India
Laishram Prem Kumar Singh (born 1995), Indian professional footballer
Laishram Premjit Singh (born 2002), Indian professional footballer

See also
Laish (disambiguation)